The Frank Mathers Trophy is to be presented to the American Hockey League (AHL) team that finishes with the best regular season record in the Canadian Division for the 2020–21 AHL season, a division created for that season due to the COVID-19 pandemic.

Prior to the impact of the COVID-19 pandemic on the 2020–21 season, the Frank Mathers Trophy was awarded annually to the AHL team that finished with the best regular season record in the Southern Division (1996), Mid-Atlantic Division (1997–2001), South Division (2002–2003), East Division (2012–2015) and Eastern Conference (2004–2011, 2016–2020).

The award is named after former Hershey Bears player, coach, general manager, and team president Frank Mathers.

Winners

Winner by season
Key
‡ = Eventual Calder Cup champions

References

External links
Official AHL website
AHL Hall of Fame Trophies

American Hockey League trophies and awards